Michael L. W. Thewalt (born 5 December 1949 in Karlsruhe, Germany) is a Canadian physicist. He received his BSc from McMaster University in 1972. His MSc and PhD were from the University of British Columbia in the mid-1970s. He teaches at Simon Fraser University and is known for researching semiconductors, especially isotopically enriched silicon.

Awards 
1994 Rutherford Memorial Medal
2004 Brockhouse Medal
2013 SFU Dean's Award for Excellence in Graduate Supervision

References 

Canadian physicists
McMaster University alumni
Academic staff of Simon Fraser University
Living people
1949 births
Presidents of the Canadian Association of Physicists
Fellows of the American Physical Society